Leuronychus is a genus of harvestmen in the family Sclerosomatidae from North America.

Species
 Leuronychus fulviventris (F.O.Pickard-Cambridge, 1904)
 Leuronychus pacificus (Banks, 1894)

References

Harvestmen
Harvestman genera